Jon Cohen is an American novelist and screenwriter. As a screenwriter he is best known for his co-writing contribution to the Steven Spielberg-directed film Minority Report (2002).

A native of Swarthmore, Pennsylvania, Cohen worked as a critical care nurse in Philadelphia before becoming a writer. He published four books: Max Lakeman and the Beautiful Stranger (1991), The Man in the Window (first published in 1992 and then reissued 2013 by Nancy Pearl's Book Lust Rediscoveries), Dentist Man (1993), and Harry's Trees (2018). He received a creative writing grant from the National Endowment for the Arts in 1991. In 2002, he won a Saturn Award for Best Writing for his work on Minority Report, sharing the award with co-writer Scott Frank.

References

External links

20th-century American novelists
American male screenwriters
Living people
People from Delaware County, Pennsylvania
Writers from Philadelphia
Year of birth missing (living people)
American male novelists
20th-century American male writers
Novelists from Pennsylvania
Screenwriters from Pennsylvania